The Tohono Oʼodham High School is a high school in unincorporated Pima County, Arizona, in the Tohono Oʼodham Indian Reservation. Located along Arizona State Route 86 (mile marker 74), near Sells, it is operated directly by the Bureau of Indian Education. Feeder schools include the San Simon day school and the Santa Rosa Boarding School, also operated by the BIA. It was established in the mid-1980s as the remaining reservations in Arizona finally received their own high schools.

The public district schools in the area are operated by Baboquivari Unified School District.

References

External links
 Tohono Oʼodham High School - Bureau of Indian Affairs

Public high schools in Arizona
Schools in Pima County, Arizona
Bureau of Indian Education schools in Arizona
Tohono O'odham Nation